Kamienna Wola  is a village in the administrative district of Gmina Odrzywół, within Przysucha County, Masovian Voivodeship, in east-central Poland.

References

Kamienna Wola